Lars Hielscher (born 9 May 1979) is a German table tennis player. He competed in the men's doubles event at the 2004 Summer Olympics.

References

External links
 

1979 births
Living people
German male table tennis players
Olympic table tennis players of Germany
Table tennis players at the 2004 Summer Olympics
Sportspeople from Hanover